Gompholobium shuttleworthii is a species of flowering plant in the pea family Fabaceae and is endemic to the south-west of Western Australia. It is an erect shrub with pinnate leaves with five to nine leaflets, and pink or purple flowers with some darker markings.

Description
Flowering occurs from September to December and the fruit is a cylindrical pod.

Taxonomy
Gompholobium shuttleworthii was first formally described in 1844 by Carl Meissner in Lehmann's Plantae Preissianae. The specific epithet (shuttleworthii) honours Robert J. Shuttleworth.

Distribution and habitat
This species of pea grows in a range of habitats including flats and rocky outcrops in the Avon Wheatbelt, Geraldton Sandplains, Jarrah Forest, Mallee and Swan Coastal Plain biogeographic regions of south-western Western Australia.

Conservation status
Gompholobium shuttleworthii is classified as "not threatened" by the Government of Western Australia Department of Biodiversity, Conservation and Attractions.

References

Mirbelioids
shuttleworthii
Fabales of Australia
Flora of Western Australia
Plants described in 1844
Taxa named by Carl Meissner